Past life, a concept found within reincarnation, may refer to:

Film and television
 Past Life (film), a 2016 Israeli film by Avi Nesher
 Past Life (TV series), a 2010 American crime drama series
 "Past Life" (Agents of S.H.I.E.L.D.), a 2018 episode
 "Past Life" (Runaways), a 2018 episode

Songs
 "Past Life" (Trevor Daniel song), 2020
 "Past Life", by Arkells, 2022
 "Past Life", by Maggie Rogers from Heard It in a Past Life, 2019
 "Past Life", by Tame Impala from Currents, 2015

See also 
 Past Lives (disambiguation)
 Past life regression
 Rebirth (disambiguation)
 Reincarnation (disambiguation)